Oskar Werner (born Oskar Josef Bschließmayer; 13 November 1922 23 October 1984) was an Austrian stage and cinema actor whose prominent roles include two 1965 films, The Spy Who Came in from the Cold and Ship of Fools. Other notable films include Decision Before Dawn (1951), Jules and Jim (1962), Fahrenheit 451 (1966), The Shoes of the Fisherman (1968) and Voyage of the Damned (1976).

Werner accepted both stage and film roles throughout his career. He won a Golden Globe for Best Supporting Actor, and had been nominated several times for the Golden Globe, the Academy Award as well as the BAFTA Award.

Early life
Born in Vienna, Werner spent much of his childhood in the care of his grandmother, who entertained him with stories about the Burgtheater, the Austrian state theatre, where he was accepted at the age of 18 by Lothar Müthel. He was the youngest person to receive this recognition. He made his theatre debut using the stage name Oskar Werner in October 1941.

In December 1941, Werner was drafted into the Deutsche Wehrmacht. As a pacifist and staunch opponent of National Socialism, he was determined to avoid advancement in the military.

He was assigned to peeling potatoes and cleaning latrines instead of being sent to the Eastern Front. In 1944, he secretly married actress , who was half Jewish.

They had a daughter Eleanore. That December, he deserted the Wehrmacht and fled with his wife and daughter to the Wienerwald (Vienna Woods), where they remained in hiding until the end of the war. He would later remember, "The artillery fire was constant for two and a half days. The shells hit all around our little hut and it was shaking like a leaf ... We knew that to go out there would be suicide, but it was better than to have to wait for execution."

Career

Early
Werner returned to the Burgtheater and acted in productions at the Raimund Theater and the Theater in der Josefstadt, frequently playing character roles. He made his film debut in Der Engel mit der Posaune, directed by Karl Hartl, in 1948. The following year he portrayed Ludwig van Beethoven's nephew Karl in Eroica.

In 1950, Werner journeyed to the United Kingdom to reprise the role he had played in Der Engel mit der Posaune in its English-language version The Angel with the Trumpet, directed by Anthony Bushell. He and his wife divorced at about this time but remained friends. He appeared in a few more German-Austrian films before going to Hollywood for a lead role in the 20th Century Fox war film Decision Before Dawn.

When the subsequent roles promised by the studio failed to materialize, he returned to Europe and settled in Triesen, Liechtenstein in a home he designed and built with a friend. He returned to the stage and performed in Hamlet, Danton's Death, Henry IV, Henry V, Torquato Tasso, and Becket.

After a period of inactivity in films, Werner appeared in five in 1955, including Mozart, in which he played the title role, and Lola Montès, directed by Max Ophüls. It was not until 1962, when he appeared in Jules and Jim, that he began to draw critical acclaim and international recognition.

Later
Werner's portrayal of the philosophical Dr. Schumann in the 1965 film Ship of Fools won him the New York Film Critics Circle Award for Best Actor and nominations for the Academy Award for Best Actor, the Golden Globe Award for Best Actor – Motion Picture Drama, and the BAFTA Award for Best Foreign Actor. His portrayal of Fiedler in The Spy Who Came in from the Cold (1965) won him the Golden Globe Award for Best Supporting Actor – Motion Picture and his second BAFTA nomination.

In 1966, he played a book-burning fireman Guy Montag who rebels against a controlled society in François Truffaut's Fahrenheit 451 by Ray Bradbury. He played an orchestra conductor in Interlude and a Vatican priest loosely based on Pierre Teilhard de Chardin in The Shoes of the Fisherman in 1968.

In the early 1970s, Werner returned to the stage and spent time traveling in Israel, Italy, Malta, France, and the United States. He appeared in the episode of Columbo titled "Playback" in 1975, and the following year made his final screen appearance in Voyage of the Damned, for which he received another Golden Globe nomination. He had an uncredited role as an SS Officer in the 1974 film The Odessa File.

His last stage appearance was in a production of The Prince of Homburg in 1983, and he made his last public appearance in 1984 at the Mozart Hall in Salzburg 10 days before his death.

Personal life
In 1944, while serving in the Wehrmacht, Werner secretly married actress Elisabeth Kallina, who was half Jewish. The couple had a daughter, Eleanore.   They divorced in 1952. In 1954, he married Anne Power, the daughter of French actress Annabella and adopted daughter of Tyrone Power. They were divorced in 1968. From 1965 to 1969, Werner was in a relationship with Diana Bennett Wanger, daughter of actress Joan Bennett, and they had one son, Felix Florian Werner, born 1966.

Werner was an alcoholic, which contributed heavily to the decline of his health and career.

On 22 October 1984, he cancelled a reading at the Hotel Europäischer Hof in Marburg an der Lahn, Germany, feeling ill. He was found dead of a heart attack the following morning, at 61. He is buried in Liechtenstein.

Filmography and television work

See also
 List of Austrian film actors
 List of German-speaking Academy Award winners and nominees
 List of Liechtensteiners
 List of people from Vienna

References

External links

 
 

1922 births
1984 deaths
20th-century Austrian male actors
Austrian expatriate male actors in the United States
Austrian expatriates in Liechtenstein
Austrian male film actors
Austrian male television actors
Austrian military personnel of World War II
Austrian pacifists
Austrian soldiers
Best Supporting Actor Golden Globe (film) winners
Burials in Germany
Deserters
German Army soldiers of World War II
Male actors from Vienna
People from Mariahilf